Ceuthomadarus tenebrionellus is a moth in the family Lecithoceridae. It was described by Josef Johann Mann in 1864. It is found in Iran and Asia Minor.

References

Moths described in 1864
Ceuthomadarinae